Alex Bally (born 25 February 1942) is a Swiss sailor. He competed in the Finn event at the 1968 Summer Olympics.

References

External links
 

1942 births
Living people
Swiss male sailors (sport)
Olympic sailors of Switzerland
Sailors at the 1968 Summer Olympics – Finn
Sportspeople from Tehran